The Beloved Vagabond is a 1936 British musical drama film directed by Curtis Bernhardt and starring Maurice Chevalier, Betty Stockfeld, Margaret Lockwood and Austin Trevor. The film was made at Ealing Studios by the independent producer Ludovico Toeplitz.

Plot
In 1900, a poor but promising French architect (Gaston de Nerac) living in London woos the daughter (Joanne Rushworth) of a gentleman facing economic ruin through exposure of his financial wrongdoing. A rival for the hand of Joanne (Count de Verneuil) promises to resolve the father’s economic problems in return for the hand of Joanne. Gaston feels obliged to agree and returns to France taking with him Asticot, a young boy also living in the boarding house. (Gaston is very encouraging of Asticot’s drawing and he in return regards Gaston as a patron and friend. In the world of film, a boy running away with a man needs no further explanation… the boy becomes effectively de Nerac’s adopted son.)

During their meanderings in rural France, Gaston and Asticot meet a young woman, Blanquette, who is trying to support herself through music. They get together and become a musical partnership, finally moving to Paris where in a bar Gaston bumps into the Count de Verneuil – Gaston’s old rival – who is now married to Joanne. Shortly after the meeting, the Count dies and Joanne is once more a free woman.

Joanne meets with Gaston and they re-establish the warm relationship of old, a painful process for Blanquette who, by this time, has fallen in love with Gaston (though he is oblivious to this).

Gaston and Joanne return to London to make plans for their wedding. Gaston invites Blanquette and Asticot to the wedding and they bring with them the spirit of life on the road. This is fascinating for the other conservative guests but annoying for Joanne who relegates the two to the kitchen to be fed away from the other guests. This proves too much for Gaston who rows with Joanne. When Joanne reveals to Gaston the obvious – that Blanquette is in love with him—he races off to find his two friends. But they have already departed for the train to Dover and the ferry to France.

Gaston requires the help of a horseless carriage to get to Dover to join Blanquette and Asticot. On the boat, he surprises Blanquette and tells her that he wants to be with his wife. She is puzzled and looks around for another woman before realising that she is the wife Gaston is referring to. A happy ending is guaranteed.

Cast
 Maurice Chevalier as Gaston de Nerac 'Paragot'  
 Betty Stockfeld as Joanna Rushworth  
 Margaret Lockwood as Blanquette  
 Desmond Tester as Asticot  
 Austin Trevor as Count de Verneuil  
 Peter Haddon as Major Walters  
 Charles Carson as Charles Rushworth  
 Cathleen Nesbitt as Mme. Boin  
 Barbara Gott as Concierge  
 Amy Veness as Cafe Owner  
 D.J. Williams as Undertaker  
 C. Denier Warren as Railway Clerk

Production
The film was shot in English and French versions with different supporting casts.

It was an early role for Margaret Lockwood.

Bibliography
 Low, Rachael. Filmmaking in 1930s Britain. George Allen & Unwin, 1985.
 Perry, George. Forever Ealing. Pavilion Books, 1994.
 Wood, Linda. British Films, 1927-1939. British Film Institute, 1986.

References

External links

Beloved Vagabond at TCMDB
Review of film at Variety

1936 films
British historical musical films
1930s musical drama films
1930s historical musical films
Films set in the 19th century
Films set in France
Films set in London
Films directed by Curtis Bernhardt
Ealing Studios films
Films scored by Darius Milhaud
British multilingual films
British black-and-white films
Sound film remakes of silent films
Films based on British novels
Columbia Pictures films
British musical drama films
1936 multilingual films
1936 drama films
1930s English-language films
1930s British films